Chelidonura mariagordae is a species of sea slug or headshield slug, a marine opisthobranch gastropod mollusc in the family Aglajidae. It is chiefly found in the Bahamas. The species is also known as Chelidonura normani, a name it was given in 2011 by Dupont & Valdés.

References 

 WoRMS

Aglajidae
Gastropods described in 2004